TRV Tailor (803) was one of three Torpedo Recovery Vessels operated by the Royal Australian Navy (RAN) and Defence Maritime Services (DMS). Ordered in 1969, the vessel, originally identified as TRV 255, was completed in 1971 and assigned to the naval base  in Sydney. The ship received a name and the pennant number "TRV 803" in 1983. In 1988, the three vessels were sold to DMS. Tailor was assigned to the naval base  in Western Australia. Tailor was decommissioned in 2018.

Design and construction

The class was ordered in 1969 as replacements for World War II-era torpedo recovery vessels.

Propulsion machinery consists of three GM V8 diesels, which supply  to the three propeller shafts. Each Fish-class vessel can recover up to eight torpedoes via a watertight stern gate.<ref name=Gillett104.5>Gillett, 'Australian and New Zealand Warships since 1946, pp. 104–5</ref> They are unarmed, and their sensor suite is limited to an I-band navigational radar. Nine personnel make up the crew.

Three vessels were built at Williamstown Dockyard for the Royal Australian Navy, with TRV 255 completed in April 1971.Saunders (ed.), IHS Jane's Fighting Ships 2012–2013, p. 36

Operational history
On entering service, TRV 255 was assigned to the naval base  in Sydney. In addition to torpedo recovery, the vessels were used as dive tenders and as training vessels for the Royal Australian Naval Reserve.

In 1983, the boats were named and redesignated, with TRV 255 become Tailor, with the pennant number "TRV 803".

In 1988, the three vessels were sold to DMS. Tailor'' was still active with DMS as of 2012.

In 2018, TRV Tailor was decommissioned and put up for sale to the public.

Citations

References

Ships built in Victoria (Australia)
Fish-class torpedo recovery vessels